The International Nuclear Regulators' Association (INRA) was established in January 1997 and is an association of the most senior officials of the nuclear regulatory authorities of the following countries:
 Canada: Canadian Nuclear Safety Commission
 France: Autorité de sûreté nucléaire
 Germany:
 Japan: Japanese Atomic Energy Commission
 Republic of Korea [Nuclear Safety and Security Commission]
 Spain:Consejo de Seguridad Nuclear
 Sweden: Swedish Radiation Safety Authority
 United Kingdom:
 United States: Nuclear Regulatory Commission

The main purpose of the association is to influence and enhance nuclear safety, from the regulatory prospective, among its members and worldwide.

Other international nuclear organizations include International Atomic Energy Agency and Nuclear Energy Agency.

Notable people
 Laurence Williams, Chairman from 2000 to 2002

References

Nuclear regulatory organizations